State Service for Registration of Plant Varieties and Seed Control operating under the Ministry of Agriculture is an executive body that is responsible for examination, registration and protection of plant varieties. It also ensures supervision and execution of state control over seed production.

History 
State Service for Registration of Plant Varieties and Seed Control under the Ministry of Agriculture of the Republic of Azerbaijan was established by the Order of the President of the Republic of Azerbaijan No 761 dated October 3, 2014 on the basis of Republican Seed Inspectorate, the State Commission for the Testing and Protection of Selection Achievements and the Republican Cotton Seed Control Station.

Duties of the organization 

 The organization tends to implement the examination of plant varieties based on their date; checking their differentiation, similarity and stability; registers plant varieties based on test results and finally informs the Ministry that it is officially subordinated;
 Issuing patent and certificates on selection achievements (plant varieties); registering selection achievements of plant varieties;
 Conducting additional testing of selection achievements (plant varieties) in certain cases defined by the law of the Republic of Azerbaijan;
 Recording license agreements for utilization of the selection achievements (plant varieties);
 Takes measures to prevent the production and sale of seeds and their hybrids that have not been registered in the State Register;
 Publishing information about the plant varieties on its official website;
 Attesting and registering the enterprises that deals with sees-growing;
 Eliminating seeds and planting materials which do not comply with state standards, technical requirements and do not have qualitative documents and preventing their sales;
 Implementing the control of experiments (ground surveillance control programs) of original, super elite, elite and reproductive seeds that have not included in the state register;
 Taking measures to prepare specialists and increase their qualifications;
 Organizing the publish of official government documents, catalogs, certificates, accounting forms applied in the field of sees-growing;
 Delivering information to the public about its activities though creating its website and including those information that are publishable  according to the law, and updating of this information regularly;

Activities 
The main activities of the State Service include the examination and registration of new varieties of agricultural crops, protection of the rights of the author and patent owner, certification of seeds in the manner prescribed by the Law of the Republic of Azerbaijan "On Seeds". The Service cooperates with relevant international organizations, relevant state bodies (agencies) of foreign states, and tries to learn their relevant experience in this field.

References

External links 
 Azərbaycan Respublikasinin Kənd Təsərrüfati Nazi̇rli̇y Yaninda N Bi̇tki Sortlarinin R Qeydi̇yyatiVə A Toxum Nəzarəti̇ Üzrə T Dövlət Xi̇dməti ̇XİDMƏTİ 

Government agencies of Azerbaijan